Matsueda is a Japanese surname.  The most common written form is 松枝, meaning "pine branch".

Matsueda may refer to the following people:

 Noriko Matsueda 松枝 賀子, composer
 Sueko Matsueda Kimura, artist